Roy E. York (December 3, 1879 –April 8, 1955) was an American politician and farmer.

York was born in Tecumseh, Johnson County, Nebraska and went to Nebraska State Normal College. He settled in Lake Wilson, Murray County, Minnesota, in 1914, with his wife and family and was a farmer. York served on the Lake Wilson School Board for nine years. he served in the Minnesota House of Representatives from 1943 to 1946. He died in Murray County, Minnesota.

References

1879 births
1955 deaths
Farmers from Minnesota
People from Murray County, Minnesota
People from Tecumseh, Nebraska
University of Nebraska at Kearney alumni
School board members in Minnesota
Members of the Minnesota House of Representatives